Vakamok is a populated place situated in Pima County, Arizona, United States, adjacent to the international border with Mexico. Historically, it has been known by several names, including Comot, Comoti, and Rusty Shovel. Vakamok is an O'odham word meaning "rusty". The traditional O'odham name for the village was Popolo Vakamakatuk, but the current name was made official as a result of a decision in 1941 by the Board on Geographic Names.

References

Populated places in Pima County, Arizona